Lisa Lents (born December 15, 1986 in Soviet Union) is a Danish-Belarusian celebrity & TV personality.  She is a professional model & former Miss World Denmark who represented Denmark in Miss World 2008 in South Africa.

References

External links
 Lisa's portfolio in Model.se
 Lisa's portfolio in Jurgita
 

1986 births
Living people
Miss World 2008 delegates
Danish beauty pageant winners
Belarusian emigrants to Denmark